Srđan Radosavljev (born 25 May 1983) is a Serbian professional footballer who plays mainly as midfielder for FK Bačka 1901.

Born in Vršac, SR Serbia, he represented several clubs during his career, spending most of the time with Mladost Apatin and Banat Zrenjanin.

References

External links
 

1983 births
Living people
People from Vršac
Serbian footballers
Association football midfielders
FK Proleter Zrenjanin players
FK Mladost Apatin players
FK Vojvodina players
FK Banat Zrenjanin players
FK Palić players
FK Bačka 1901 players
Serbian SuperLiga players